The  series consists of seventeen yakuza films based on the novel by Tōkō Kon. starring Shintaro Katsu and Jiro Tamiya,  produced between 1960 and 1974.

Films

Shintaro  Katsu series

  (1961) directed by Tokuzō Tanaka　
  (1961) directed by Tokuzō Tanaka
  (1962) directed by Kazuo Mori
  (1962) directed by Tokuzō Tanaka
  (1963) directed by Tokuzō Tanaka
  (1963) directed by Kazuo Mori
  (1963) directed by Kazuo Mori
  (1963) directed by Tokuzō Tanaka
  (1964) directed by Kazuo Mori
  (1965) directed by Tokuzō Tanaka
  (1965) directed by Tokuzō Tanaka
  (1966) directed by Tokuzō Tanaka
  (1967) directed by Kimiyoshi Yasuda
  (1968) directed by Kazuo Mori
  (1969) directed by Masahiro Makino
  (1974) directed by Yasuzo Masumura

Koji Matoba series
  (2001)
  (2001)

References

External links

Yakuza films
Japanese film series
Films with screenplays by Yoshikata Yoda
Films directed by Tokuzō Tanaka
Daiei Film films
1960s Japanese films